Mikaila Dominique Enriquez (born December 15, 1986), known as Mikaila, is an American singer, actress, and songwriter from Edmond, Oklahoma. She is best known for her role as Melina Finch in the PBS series Wishbone.

Early life
Mikaila became interested in singing when she was 3 years old. She is of French, Spanish and Native Mexican descent. Mikaila's family were members of Citychurch. Mikaila has an older sister named Jessica. At the age of three she began singing gospel music. Mikaila's parents enrolled her in voice lessons when she was four years old. She attended Washington Irving Elementary School in Oklahoma. After moving to Dallas with her family, she became a regular performer at Texas Rangers games. After heading to New York, she had meetings with several labels. It was at that time that Barbara Cameron, the mother of former Growing Pains star Kirk Cameron and former Full House star Candace Cameron Bure became her agent. Marty Rendleman eventually became her music manager.

Acting career
In 1997, she was cast as Melina Finch during Season 2 of Wishbone. In 1998 she reprised her role in Wishbone's Dog Days of the West.

Music career
In 1996, before her time on Wishbone Mikaila was signed to the independent record label Union Records and released her debut gospel album titled This Little Light. The proceeds from the album were to help benefit children who lost their parents in the 1995 Oklahoma City Bombing. The following year, Mikaila released her second album titled Dreams. In 1998 Mikaila sang America The Beautiful and This Little Light of Mine on the movie soundtrack for Wishbone's Dog Days of the West. Three years later, in 2000, at the age of 13, Mikaila left Union Records and was signed to Island Records. Her song "So In Love With Two" went to No. 29 on the Rhythmic Top 40 Billboard chart, No. 25 on the Billboard Hot 100 and No. 27 on Billboards Top 40 Mainstream. In 2001 Mikaila released her third and final studio album Mikaila (album). That same year her family moved to California so that she could pursue her pop career. The album itself went to No. 20 on the Top Heatseekers chart. Mikaila received mixed reviews. Her second and final single "It's All Up To You" didn't chart well. Mikaila released a remix CD single for "So In Love With Two" and a Spanish version of the song in 2001. In 2000, Mikaila was the opening act for Britney Spears during her Oops!... I Did It Again Tour. She also sang at Jingle Ball 2000. That same year Mikaila performed her song "So In Love With Two" in the 74th Annual Macy's Thanksgiving Day Parade. In 2001 Mikaila Enriquez sang her song "Perfect World" for the movie soundtrack for Get Over It (film). Before Mikaila retired from singing she released her final album in Spanish. Due to her career failing Mikaila retired from acting and singing in 2002. She left Island Records. After retiring from acting and singing Mikaila's family moved to Sun City, Arizona. After graduating from high school Mikaila moved to Phoenix, Arizona.

Discography

Studio albums
 This Little Light (1996)
 Dreams (1997)
 Mikaila (2001)
 Mikaila (Spanish Version) (2001)

Singles
 "So In Love With Two" (2000)
 "It's All Up to You" (2001)
 "So In Love With Two (Remixes)" (2001)
 "Este Amor de Dos" (2001)

Soundtracks
 1998 - "Wishbone's Dog Days of the West"
 2001 - "Get Over It"

References

External links
 Mikaila at IMDB
 Mikaila at MySpace

1986 births
Living people
American child actresses
American child singers
American women pop singers
American television actresses
People from Edmond, Oklahoma
Singers from Oklahoma
Singers from Texas
Singers from Arizona
People from Dallas
American people of French descent
American people of Spanish descent
Hispanic and Latino American women singers
Island Records artists
20th-century American actresses
20th-century American women singers
21st-century American women singers
American gospel singers
20th-century American singers
21st-century American singers